Claude Pujade-Renaud (born 1932) is a French writer, whose first novel Le Ventriloque appeared in 1978. Since that time she has published over twenty novels, short-story and poetry collections, as well as combined creative works with long-time partner Daniel Zimmermann. She won the prix Goncourt des lycéens in 1994 for Belle mère, her novel on stepmothering, and is a recipient of the French Writer's Guild Prize for her life's work.

A dance teacher, she taught Body Expression courses at the University of Paris-VIII, and is the author of a number of pedagogical texts relating to the body and the class-room.

Childlessness and sexuality are recurring themes in her novels, which have veered towards the historical in the latter part of her career.

None of her work is available in English.

Works
Novels
 1988 : La Danse océane, Fabert; Actes Sud Babel 1996
 1992 : Martha ou le Mensonge du mouvement, Manya; Actes Sud Babel 1996
 1994 : Belle mère, Actes Sud Babel; J'ai Lu 1997
 1996 : La Nuit la neige, Actes Sud; Actes Sud Babel 1998; J'ai Lu 1998
 1997 : Le Sas de l'absence, Actes Sud, prix de lécrit intime; Actes Sud Babel 2000 (publié avec La Ventriloque)
 1998 : A Corps et A Raison
 1999 : Platon était malade, Actes Sud
 2004 : Le Jardin forteresse, Actes Sud
 2006 : Chers Disparus, Actes Sud
 2007 : Le Désert de la grâce, Actes Sud
 2008 : Transhumance des ombres, Circa 1924
 2010 : Les Femmes du braconnier , Actes Sud

Short Stories
 1985 : Les Enfants des autres, Actes Sud
 1989: Un si joli petit livre, Actes Sud, Prix de la Fondation Thyde-Monnier; Actes Sud Babel 1999
 1991 : Vous êtes toute seule ?, Actes Sud, prix de la nouvelle du Rotary Club; Actes Sud Babel 1994; Librio 1997
 1993 : La Chatière, Actes Sud
 2001 : Au Lecteur précoce, Actes Sud
 2007 : Sous les mets les mots, Nil

Poetry
 2003 : Instants incertitudes, Le Cherche midi éditeur

Diverse
 2000 : Celles qui savaient, Actes Sud

With Daniel Zimmermann
 1995 : Les Écritures mêlées, éditions Julliard
 2000 : Septuor, Le Cherche midi éditeur
 2004: Duel. Correspondance 1973-1993, Le Cherche midi éditeur
 2004 : Championne à Olympie, Gallimard, Folio Junior

Collective Novel
 1995 : L'Affaire Grimaudi, Editions du Rocher (with Alain Absire, Jean-Claude Bologne, Michel Host, Dominique Noguez, Martin Winckler, Daniel Zimmermann)

References

People from Bizerte
1932 births
Living people
20th-century French poets
French women poets
Prix Goncourt des lycéens winners
20th-century French women writers